The Spartaeinae are a subfamily of the spider family Salticidae (jumping spiders). The subfamily was established by Fred R. Wanless in 1984 to include the groups Boetheae, Cocaleae, Lineae, Codeteae and Cyrbeae, which in turn were defined by Eugène Simon.

The Spartaeinae are palaeotropical, with an exceptional diversity in the Malaysian and Indonesian archipelagos.

They are unusual salticids that are considered basal to the phylogenetic tree of jumping spiders. Like the Lyssomaninae they lack many derived features that the Salticinae possess. Spartaeinae usually have large posterior median eyes. However, these were reduced in the genera Cyrba, Gelotia and Wanlessia.

Genera
In 2015, Spartaeinae was divided into three tribes with 29 genera. One has been added since.

Tribe Cocalodini

 Allococalodes Wanless, 1982
 Cocalodes Pocock, 1897
 Cucudeta Maddison, 2009
 Depreissia Lessert, 1942
 Tabuina Maddison, 2009
 Yamangalea Maddison, 2009

Tribe Lapsiini

Amilaps Maddison, 2019
 Galianora Maddison, 2006
 Lapsamita Ruiz, 2013
 Lapsias Simon, 1900
 Soesiladeepakius Makhan, 2007
 Thrandina Maddison, 2006

Tribe Spartaeini

 Brettus Thorell, 1895
 Cocalus C. L. Koch, 1846
 Cyrba Simon, 1876
 Gelotia Thorell, 1890
 Holcolaetis Simon, 1886
 Meleon Wanless, 1984
 Mintonia Wanless, 1984
 Neobrettus Wanless, 1984
 Paracyrba Żabka & Kovac, 1996
 Phaeacius Simon, 1900
 Portia Karsch, 1878
 Sonoita Peckham & Peckham, 1903
 Sparbambus Zhang, Woon & Li, 2006
 Spartaeus Thorell, 1891
 Taraxella Wanless, 1984
 Veissella Wanless, 1984
 Wanlessia Wijesinghe, 1992
 Yaginumanis Wanless, 1984

References

Salticidae
Spider subfamilies